Wild Streak is the forty-first studio album by American musician Hank Williams Jr. It was released by Warner Bros. Records on June 21, 1988. "If the South Woulda Won" and "Early in the Morning and Late at Night" were released as singles. The album reached No. 1 on the Top Country Albums chart and has been certified Gold by the RIAA.

"Tuesday's Gone" is a Lynyrd Skynyrd cover which later appeared on the 1994 compilation Skynyrd Frynds.

Track listing

Production
Produced By Hank Williams Jr., Barry Beckett & Jim Ed Norman
Engineers: Chris Hammond, Scott Hendricks
Assistant Engineer: Ken Criblez
Mixing: Scott Hendricks, Mark Nevers
Mastering: Carlos Grier, Denny Purcell

Personnel
Drums: Matt Betton, Bill Marshall
Bass: Ray Barrickman, Michael Rhodes
Keyboards, Synthesizers: Barry Beckett, Billy Earheart, John Jarvis, Mike Lawler
Programming: Carl Marsh
Guitars: Dino Bradley, Gary Rossington, Wayne Turner, Billy Joe Walker, Jr., Reggie Young
Steel Guitar: Eddie Long
Fiddle: Mark O'Connor
Horns: Herbert Bruce, Ray Carroll, Quitman Dennis, Jack Hale, Michael Haynes, Jim Horn, Jerry McKinney

Charts

Weekly charts

Year-end charts

References

1988 albums
Hank Williams Jr. albums
Warner Records albums
Albums produced by Barry Beckett
Albums produced by Jim Ed Norman